The XII International Chopin Piano Competition was held from 1 to 20 October 1990 in Warsaw. For the first time in the history of the competition, the first prize was not awarded.

Awards 
The competition consisted of three stages and a final. For the first time in the history of the competition, there was no winner. Musicologist  recalled: "The 12th Competition passed without any manifestations of great admiration and without any great controversy. Youngsters did not choose their idols, and the favourites failed to ignite people’s imagination. One was hard pressed to notice any of the feverishly sparkling eyes that one remembered from previous competitions. No one in the audience fainted from emotion; if anyone, only a pianist." 

The following prizes were awarded: 

Three special prizes were awarded:

Jury 
The jury consisted of: 
  Vladimir Ashkenazy ( V)
  Ryszard Bakst
  Halina Czerny-Stefańska ( IV)
  
  Sergei Dorensky
  Jan Ekier (chairman)
  Leon Fleisher
  Lidia Grychtołówna
  Barbara Hesse-Bukowska ( IV)
  Andrzej Jasiński
  Cyprien Katsaris
  Ivan Klánský
  Hiroko Nakamura
  Gerhard Oppitz
  Piotr Paleczny
  Bernard Ringeissen
  Maria Tipo
   (vice chairman)
  Lev Vlassenko (vice chairman)
  
  Tadeusz Żmudziński

References

Further reading

External links 
 

 

International Chopin Piano Competition
1990 in music
1990 in Poland
1990 in Polish music
1990s in Warsaw
October 1990 events in Europe